The Adjacent Territories Order was a British order in council issued in 1880 to transfer the ownership of most of the remaining lands in British North America (British Arctic Territories) to the Dominion of Canada. This excluded the Newfoundland Colony, which joined Canada in 1949.

The lands transferred were assigned to the North-West Territories and consolidated the Arctic region with land ceded from the Hudson's Bay Company (North-Western Territory and Rupert's Land).

References

Orders in Council
1880 in British law
1880 in Canada
1880s in the Northwest Territories